Margaret Gove Camfferman (1881 – 1964) was an American painter. 

She was born Margaret Gove in 1881 Rochester, Minnesota. She went on to study at the Minneapolis School of Fine Arts.
In 1915 she moved to Whidby Island, Washington, where she married Peter Camfferman, a Dutch artist. She was a member of Seattle's Group of Twelve and also the Women Artists of Washington. 

Her work is included in the permanent collection of the Seattle Art Museum and the General Services Administration.

References

1881 births
1964 deaths
People from Rochester, Minnesota
Minneapolis College of Art and Design alumni
Artists from Minnesota
20th-century American women artists